West Cracroft Island is an island in the Johnstone Strait region of the Central Coast of British Columbia, Canada, located east of Port McNeill.  It is the larger of the two Cracroft Islands, the other, East Cracroft Island, being so named to distinguish between the two islands, which at low tide are one island.

Name origin
She accompanied Lady Jane Franklin on her round-the-world voyage, which brought them to British Columbia during the Fraser Gold Rush of 1858. They remained in British Columbia and explored its coast in 1861 before returning to England.

See also
List of islands of British Columbia
Cracroft (disambiguation)

References

Islands of British Columbia
Central Coast of British Columbia